Rune Høydahl (born 10 December 1969) is a Norwegian former mountain biker. He won 11 UCI World Cup races, and three times came second overall. Besides John Tomac, Hoydahl is the only mountain biker with World Cup victories in both downhill and cross country.

In 1995 Høydahl won five World Cup races in a row. He represented Norway at the 1996 Summer Olympics in Atlanta, Georgia and the 2000 Summer Olympics in Sydney. In addition, he won the Norseman triathlon in 2004 after having retired. He was also the captain of his own professional mountain bike team - Team Etto/Høydahl.  He lives in Sande, 20 km south of Drammen.

References
  Wielersite Profile

1969 births
Cyclists at the 1996 Summer Olympics
Cyclists at the 2000 Summer Olympics
Olympic cyclists of Norway
Living people
Cross-country mountain bikers
Norwegian mountain bikers
Downhill mountain bikers
People from Buskerud
Sportspeople from Viken (county)